Patuakhali Polytechnic Institute is one of the oldest polytechnic institute in Bangladesh.

Departments 
Civil Technology
Electrical Technology
Electronics Technology
Computer Technology
Refrigeration & Air-Conditioning Technology

See also 
 Dhaka Polytechnic Institute

References

External links
https://web.archive.org/web/20160304110234/http://www.ppi.gov.bd/ppi/index.php/about-us

Polytechnic institutes in Bangladesh
Organisations based in Patuakhali
Educational institutions established in 1989
1989 establishments in Bangladesh